Andrés Felipe Orozco Vásquez (born 18 March 1979) is a Colombian football manager and former player who played as a central defender. He is the current assistant manager of Envigado.

Career
Orozco began his professional career with Deportes Quindío in 1999, later that year he moved to Deportivo Independiente Medellín.

In 2001, he was part of the Colombia squad that won the Copa América.

Between 2003 and 2004 Orozco played for Racing Club in the Primera Division Argentina.

Orozco joined Dorados from Racing Club mid-2004, and made his debut for the club in the 2004 Apertura.  He immediately made an impact, starting 14 of 17 possible games for the club.

Honours

Club
Independiente Medellín
Categoría Primera A: 2002 Finalización

Internacional
Copa Sudamericana: 2008

International
Colombia U20
Toulon Tournament: 1999, 2000

Colombia
Copa América: 2001

References

External links

1979 births
Living people
Colombian footballers
Footballers from Medellín
Deportes Quindío footballers
Independiente Medellín footballers
Independiente Santa Fe footballers
Sport Club Internacional players
Racing Club de Avellaneda footballers
Dorados de Sinaloa footballers
Atlético Morelia players
Atlético Nacional footballers
Envigado F.C. players
Categoría Primera A players
Argentine Primera División players
Liga MX players
Colombian expatriate footballers
Expatriate footballers in Argentina
Expatriate footballers in Brazil
Expatriate footballers in Mexico
Colombia international footballers
2001 Copa América players
2003 CONCACAF Gold Cup players
2004 Copa América players
Copa América-winning players
Association football defenders
Colombian football managers
Envigado F.C. managers